Varney may refer to:

Places:
 Varney, Ontario, a community in Canada
 Varney, Kentucky, an unincorporated community in the US
 Varney, West Virginia, an unincorporated community in the US
 Varney Nunatak, Victoria Land, Antarctica

People: 
 Varney (surname)
 Varney (given name)

Businesses:
 Varney Air Lines, a former airline in Idaho, US, predecessor of United Airlines
 Varney Scale Models a maker of model railroad equipment

See also
 "Varney the Vampire", a horror story